Obesotoma cymata is a species of sea snail, a marine gastropod mollusk in the family Mangeliidae.

Description
The length of the shell attains 23 mm, its diameter 10.5 mm.

(Original description) The shell resembles typical Obesotoma tenuilirata (Dall, 1871, but with a higher and more acute spire, and with 20 or more narrow axial riblets on the body whorl, obsolete on the base, and a single spiral thread at the shoulder.

Distribution
This marine species occurs from Nunivak Island, Bering Sea, to the Shumagin Islands, Alaska.

References

External links
  Merkuljev A.V. (2017). Taxonomic puzzle of Propebela arctica (A. Adams, 1855) (Gastropoda, Mangeliidae) - six different species under single name. Ruthenica. 27(1): 15–30
  Tucker, J.K. 2004 Catalog of recent and fossil turrids (Mollusca: Gastropoda). Zootaxa 682:1–1295.
 

cymata
Gastropods described in 1919